The Paracelsus Medical University is a private university located in Salzburg municipality, Austria and Nuremberg, Germany.

Organization and financing 
University management

 Wolfgang Sperl (Rector)
 Theodor Fischlein (Vice Rector)
 Lydia Gruber (Chancellor)
 Stephan Kolb (Vice Chencellor)

The university's legal entity is the Paracelsus Medical University Salzburg - private foundation. The committee reports to the Board of Trustees.

Board of Trustees
 Wolfgang Sperl (Chairperson)
 Volker Viechtbauer
 Lydia Gruber

Foundation board
 Christian Stöckl  (Chairperson)
 Irene Oesch-Hayward
 Bernhard Fürthauer
 Heinrich Dieter Kiener
 Andrea Klambauer
 Gertraud Leimüller
 Jürgen Rauch
 Herbert Resch
 Gerlinde Rogatsch
 Felix Sedlmayer
 Peter Unterkofler

The financing of the Paracelsus Medical University is carried out for the most part through private funds. Furthermore, it includes public funding provided by local and regional government bodies (province and city of Salzburg, Salzburg Regional Authorities Association), tuition fees and cross financing from research contracts and through net income (e.g. further education courses, etc.). Being a private university, the Paracelsus Medical University is not entitled to funding from the federal government.

Partnerships 
Constructive and beneficial partnerships in medical and scientific fields have been established with the Mayo Clinic School of Medicine (USA), Yale University (USA), University of Milan (Italy), Cambridge University (UK), University of North Florida (USA), Johns Hopkins University , Dhulikhel Hospital in Nepal as well as national universities.

A further intensive and long-standing partnership connects the Paracelsus Medical University, the University Hospital Salzburg (Landeskrankenhaus Salzburg) and the Christian Doppler Clinic. As the university was established, the clinics' formerly autonomous departments were integrated to become university clinic departments. The transformation to university hospitals followed in 2007.

The university's second location in Nuremberg with the study of human medicine is based on the cooperation with Klinikum Nuremberg (Klinikum Nürnberg).

In addition, the Paracelsus Medical University is able to make use of a broad-based network of academic teaching hospitals and teaching practices, particularly within the regions of Salzburg and Bavaria.

Studies and further education 
Degree Courses:
 Study of Human Medicine (Bachelor & Master, academic title "Dr. med. univ.")
 Study of Pharmacy (Bachelor & Master)
 Nursing Science Online (Bachelor of Science in Nursing)
 Pflege impact (Bachelor of Science in Nursing)
 Master's Degree Program in Nursing Science (Master of Science in Nursing)
 Public Health (Master of Science in Public Health)
 Advanced Nursing Practice ("Advanced Nurse Practitioner in acute care" / "Advanced Nurse Practitioner in chronic care")
 Medical Science Doctorate Study Program (Ph.D.)
 Nursing and Allied Health Sciences (Ph.D.)
 Nursing Practice & Leadership (Ph.D.)
 In addition the Paracelsus University offers a variety of postgraduate programs and degree courses.

Scientific research institutes & research centers 
 General Practice, Family Medicine and Preventive Medicine
 Anatomy and Cell Biology
 Nursing Science and Practice
 Pharmacology und Toxicology
 Pharmacy
 Physiology und Pathophysiology
 Hereditary Metabolic Diseases
 Biomechanics
 Early Life Care
 Ecomedicine
 Experimental Neuroregeneration
 Experimental and Clinical Cell Therapy
 Gastein Research Institute
 Molecular Regenerative Medicine
 Molecular Sports and Rehabilitation Medicine
 Neurointervention
 Tendon and Bone Regeneration
 Synergetic and Psychotherapy Research
 Advanced Radiation Technologies - radART
 Rehabilitation, Transition and Palliation of Neurologically Ill Children
 Spine Research

Centers:
 Clinical Research Centre Salzburg (CRCS)
 Spinal Cord Injury and Tissue Regeneration Center Salzburg (SCI-TReCS)
 Public Health and Healthcare Research

The main research focuses at the Paracelsus Medical University belong to the area of regenerative medicine: 
 Neurosciences
 Oncological, immunological and allergic diseases
 Musculoskeletal diseases, biomechanics and sports medicine
 Metabolic diseases

Research Programs:
 Experimental ophthalmology and glaucoma research
 Molecular therapy of genetic dermatoses
 Nano vesicular therapies
 Proteomics
 Psychotherapy evaluation in a complex therapy setting

See also 
 List of medical schools

External links 
 Paracelsus Medical University
 Salzburger Landeskliniken

Medical schools in Austria
Universities and colleges in Austria
Private universities and colleges in Austria